Raül López Molist (born 15 April 1980) is a Spanish former professional basketball player. He played for the Utah Jazz of the National Basketball Association (NBA). López is a native of Vic, Barcelona, in Catalonia, Spain. At a height of 6 ft 0 in (1.83 m) tall, he played at the point guard position. López was featured on the Spanish version of the NBA Live 2004 video game.

Player profile
Although López was said by some to have been the Spanish version of John Stockton, his game was often described as more similar to that of Steve Nash and Tony Parker. He was known for his quickness, court vision, unselfishness, and passing ability. Also, he had the ability to create his own shot, which was a key skill in the modern NBA and EuroLeague.

Professional career

Europe

In 1998, at 18 years old, López began his professional career with Joventut Badalona in the Spanish ACB League. In 2000, he was signed by Real Madrid where he played for two seasons. Later, during the summer of 2005, he signed with the Spanish local team Akasvayu Girona, which finished 7th at the end of the 2005–06 ACB season.

NBA

In 2001, López was selected in the first round of the 2001 NBA Draft, 24th overall, by the Utah Jazz. In September 2002, he signed his NBA rookie contract with the Utah Jazz and underwent surgery to repair the torn anterior cruciate ligament in his right knee, missing the entire 2002–03 NBA season. Finally, in the 2003–04 season, totally recovered from his knee injury, he played in all of the 82 regular season games as the backup to starting point guard Carlos Arroyo, while averaging 7.0 points, 3.7 assists and 1.9 rebounds in 19.7 minutes per game.

On 3 August 2005 López was traded from the Jazz to the Memphis Grizzlies as part of the largest trade in NBA history, involving five teams, 13 players, and two draft picks. He was subsequently cut from the Memphis Grizzlies 2005–06 roster.

Lopez' final NBA game was played on 15 February 2005 in a 95 - 102 loss to the Los Angeles Lakers. In that game, Lopez played 12 minutes as the Jazz' starting Point Guard and recorded 7 points, 1 assist and 1 rebound.

Return to Europe
López returned to Real Madrid after signing a contract in July 2006. In 2009, he moved to the VTB United League club Khimki Moscow Region. In July 2011, he returned to Spain, and signed a two-year contract with Bilbao Basket.

On 3 March 2016, López announced that he would to retire from playing basketball at the end of the 2015–16 ACB season.

National team career

Spanish junior national team

López was a member of the Spain junior national teams that won gold medals at the 1998 FIBA Europe Under-18 Championship and the 1999 FIBA Under-19 World Championship.

Spanish senior national team
López was named, along with Juan Carlos Navarro, to the senior Spain national basketball team that participated at the 2000 Summer Olympics in Sydney, Australia. He also won the bronze medal at the EuroBasket 2001. However, before playing for Spain at the 2002 FIBA World Championship, he suffered an injury to his right knee, the same one that occurred during the 2001–02 season, while he was playing with Real Madrid.

He also won the silver medal at the 2008 Summer Olympics, and the gold medal at the EuroBasket 2009.

Career statistics

Domestic leagues

References

External links
NBA.com Profile
Euroleague.net Profile
Spanish League Profile  
United League Profile
2010 FIBA World Championship Profile
EuroBasket 2009 Profile
2008 Olympics Profile
FIBA.com Video Interview With Raül López

1980 births
Living people
2010 FIBA World Championship players
Basketball players at the 2000 Summer Olympics
Basketball players at the 2008 Summer Olympics
BC Khimki players
Bilbao Basket players
Basketball players from Catalonia
CB Girona players
Joventut Badalona players
Liga ACB players
Medalists at the 2008 Summer Olympics
National Basketball Association players from Spain
Olympic basketball players of Spain
Olympic medalists in basketball
Olympic silver medalists for Spain
Sportspeople from Vic
Point guards
Real Madrid Baloncesto players
Spanish expatriate basketball people in the United States
Utah Jazz draft picks
Utah Jazz players